The fifth season talent show The Voice Senior (The Voice. 60+) premiered on September 2, 2022, on Channel One. Elena Vaenga returned as coach and replased Laima Vaikule, while Valeriy Syutkin, Alexander Malinin, and Igor Kornelyuk replaced Stas Namin, Valery Leontiev, and Oleg Gazmanov, respectively. Larisa Guzeeva replaced Dmitry Nagiev as the show's presenter.

Raisa Dmitrenko was announced the winner on October 2, 2022, marking Elena Vaenga's first win as a coach and the third female coach to win in the show's history, behind Pelageya and Tamara Gverdtsiteli. Raisa became only the 2nd winner in the show's history to have been four-chair turn in the blind auditions after Mikhail Serebryakov in season 4.

Coaches and presenter

Stas Namin, Laima Vaikule, Valery Leontiev, and Oleg Gazmanov didn't return for season five and were replaced by Igor Kornelyuk, Elena Vaenga, Alexander Malinin, and Valeriy Syutkin.

Larisa Guzeeva became as a presenter.

Teams
Colour key

Blind auditions
Colour key

The Knockouts

Final
Colour key

Best Coach
Colour key

Reception

Notes

References